Scopula subtracta is a moth of the  family Geometridae. It is found in India.

References

Moths described in 1935
Taxa named by Louis Beethoven Prout
subtracta
Moths of Asia